= Filippo De Palma =

Italian scientific instrument maker

- Born: c. 1813
- Citizenship: Italian
- Occupation: Scientific instrument maker

Filippo De Palma (c. 1813 – after 1873) was an Italian scientific instrument maker.

He was an active scientific-instrument maker in Naples in the third quarter of the nineteenth century. Exhibited in Paris in 1867 and in Vienna in 1873. Known to have produced electrical machines and physics instruments.
